Megan Smith is an American softball coach who is the current head coach at Marshall.

Coaching career

Western Carolina
On July 27, 2004, Megan Smith was hired as the first coach of the Western Carolina softball program, which would begin play in 2006. On October 2, 2006, Megan Smith resigned as head coach of Western Carolina after the inaugural season for the Catamounts.

Kansas
On June 24, 2009, Smith was announced as the new head coach of the Kansas softball program. On July 25, 2019, Smith announced that she was leaving the program to be the head coach at Marshall.

Marshall
On July 25, 2018, Smith was announced as the new head coach of the Marshall softball program.

Head coaching record
Sources:

College

References

Living people
Female sports coaches
American softball coaches
Marshall Thundering Herd softball coaches
North Carolina Tar Heels softball players
LSU Tigers softball coaches
North Carolina Tar Heels softball coaches
Western Carolina Catamounts softball coaches
Kansas Jayhawks softball coaches
Charlotte 49ers softball coaches
Young Harris Mountain Lions softball coaches
Softball players from North Carolina
People from Forsyth County, North Carolina
Year of birth missing (living people)